Hallett Peninsula is a triangular, dome-shaped peninsula,  long, with  cliffs on its eastern seaboard side and  on its west side. The peninsula extends from Cape Hallett to Cape Wheatstone and is joined to the mainland by a narrow ridge between Tucker Glacier and Edisto Inlet. It was so named by the New Zealand Geological Survey Antarctic Expedition, 1957–58, because Hallett Station on Seabee Hook was established at the north end of the peninsula.

The peninsula is an elongated shield volcano complex similar to the Adare and Daniell peninsulas. It forms part of the Hallett Volcanic Province of the McMurdo Volcanic Group. Basaltic lava of the Hallett Peninsula has been dated to 6.4 ± 0.4 million years old.

See also
Heave-ho Slope

References

Peninsulas of Antarctica
Landforms of Victoria Land
Borchgrevink Coast
Volcanoes of Victoria Land
Shield volcanoes
Miocene shield volcanoes